The 1957–58 La Liga season was the 27th since its establishment. The season started on September 15, 1957, and finished on May 4, 1958. Real Madrid is Champions.

Team locations

Zaragoza moved from its old stadium Torrero to the new La Romareda. Barcelona also moved from Las Corts to the Nou Camp, that became the biggest stadium in Spain.

League table

Results

Pichichi Trophy

External links
 Official LFP Site

1957 1958
1957–58 in Spanish football leagues
Spain